Ed Bruce is the seventh studio album by the American country music artist of the same name. It was released in 1980 via MCA Records. The album includes the singles "Diane", "The Last Cowboy Song" and "Girls, Women and Ladies".

Track listing

Chart performance

References

1980 albums
Ed Bruce albums
Albums produced by Tommy West (producer)
MCA Records albums